Sushil Prasad Koirala (12 August 1931 – 9 February 2016) was a Nepalese politician and the Prime Minister of Nepal from 11 February 2014 to 10 October 2015. He was also President of the Nepali Congress from 2010 to 2016, having earlier served under various capacities in the party.

Early life
Koirala was born to Bodh Prasad and Kumudini Koirala on 12 August 1939 in Biratnagar, second-largest city of Nepal. A member of the politically prominent Koirala family, he was the cousin of former prime ministers Matrika Prasad Koirala, Bishweshwar Prasad Koirala and Girija Prasad Koirala.

Political career
Koirala entered politics in 1954 inspired by the social-democratic ideals of the Nepali Congress. In 1958, he keenly participated in Bhadra Abagya Aandalon (Civil Disobedience Movement) launched by the Nepali Congress. In 1959, he actively involved himself in the party's objective of carrying out the democratic elections. The election saw Bishweshwar Prasad Koirala become the first elected prime minister of the country. However, King Mahendra planned and executed a coup in December 1960 and expelled the elected government led by B.P. Koirala. This resulted in the exile of several members of the Nepali Congress to India, which included Sushil Koirala. He remained in political exile in India for 16 years following the royal takeover of 1960. Koirala also spent three years in Indian prisons for his involvement in a plane hijacking in 1973. While in exile, Koirala was the editor of Tarun, the official party publication. He has been a member of the Central Working Committee of the party since 1979 and was appointed General Secretary of the party in 1996 and Vice President in 1998.

In 2001, he lost the leadership ballot for Nepali Congress' parliamentary party to former prime minister Sher Bahadur Deuba. Koirala was appointed acting president of the party in 2008 by president Girija Prasad Koirala. The 12th general convention of the Nepali Congress, on 22 September 2010, elected him party president.

The Nepali Congress emerged as the largest party in the 2013 Constituent Assembly elections under Koirala's leadership. He was elected leader of the Congress' parliamentary party securing 105 out of 194 votes against former prime minister Deuba's 89 votes, and on 10 February 2014, he was nominated as prime minister by the constituent assembly. During his tenure as prime minister, his government was criticized for its slow aid response to the April 2015 Nepal earthquake. A historic agreement among the country's four major political parties was also made that year, which paved the way for the promulgation of a new constitution. Due his major role, he is also known as the "Father of the Constitution" Honouring a pledge to stand down as prime minister once the new constitution came into effect, Koirala resigned on 10 October 2015. He sought re-election but was defeated by KP Sharma Oli, leader of Congress' former coalition partners, the CPN (UML).

Electoral history
Koirala was elected to the Pratinidhi Sabha from the Banke–2 constituency in 1991 and 1999, while he was defeated in 1994. He lost in the 2008 Constituent Assembly election from Banke–3, finishing third behind the candidates of the MJFN and the UCPN (Maoist). He contested and won from both Banke–3 and Chitwan–4 in the 2013 Constituent Assembly election. He later relinquished the Chitwan–4 seat and represented Banke–3 in the 2nd Constituent Assembly.

Only the top two candidates are shown below.

1991 Pratinidhi Sabha Election

Banke–2

1994 Pratinidhi Sabha Election

Banke–2

1999 Pratinidhi Sabha Election

Banke–2

2008 Constituent Assembly Election

Banke–3

2013 Constituent Assembly Elections

Banke–3

Chitwan–4

2015 Parliamentary Prime Minister Election

Personal life
Koirala remained unmarried throughout his life and was known to live a simple life. He was fondly known among his friends and supporters as 'Sushil daa'. Although Koirala was believed to have completed formal education with an Intermediate of Commerce (I. Comm.) degree from a college in India according to his sister-in-law, he refuted those claims and maintained to have only received informal education.

Illness and death 
A heavy smoker, Koirala was diagnosed with tongue cancer in 2006 and lung cancer in June 2014. He died on 10 February 2016 at 12:50 AM of pneumonia in Kathmandu, at the age of 76.

Bibliography

See also
Sushil Koirala Memorial Foundation
Koirala cabinet, 2013

References

External links

1939 births
2016 deaths
Government ministers of Nepal
Nepali Congress politicians from Lumbini Province
People from Biratnagar
Prime ministers of Nepal
S
Nepalese Hindus
Deaths from pneumonia in Nepal
Deaths from cancer in Nepal
Deaths from lung cancer
Nepal MPs 1991–1994
Nepal MPs 1999–2002
State funerals in Nepal
Members of the 2nd Nepalese Constituent Assembly